Margaret Katherine "Maggie" Black (22 September 1921, in  Fulham, West London – 5 August 1999, in Wandsworth, South London) was known as a food historian, a leading food writer, and an author of many children's books and plays.

Born Margaret Katherine Howorth in 1943 she married Robert Alastair Black (1921 - 1967) in Surrey. After the Second World War they moved to South Africa where she took a master's degree at the University of the Witwatersrand in Johannesburg. They returned to England in 1963 where she published No Room for Tourists (1965), a semi-biographical account of life under apartheid.

In the following years she went on to study in Switzerland and America, writing books on food history and cook books.

Selected books

 No Room for Tourists: A search for an answer to the tensions of Apartheid. (1965). Margaret Black. London, Secker and Warburg.
 Mrs Beeton's Favourite Cakes and Breads. (1972). Mrs. Beeton. Edited By Maggie Black. London, Ward Lock.
 Heritage of British Cooking. (1977) Maggie Black. Littlehampton Book Services.
 The Wholesome Food Cookbook. (1982). Maggie Black. David & Charles.
 Food and Cooking in Medieval Britain (Food and Cooking in Britain). (1985). Peter Brears and Maggie Black. English Heritage.
 The Jane Austen Cookbook. (1995, 2002). Maggie Black, Deirdre Le Faye. McClelland & Stewart.
 Food and Cooking in Nineteenth-Century Britain: History and Recipes (1996). Maggie Black. Historic England Publishing.
 The Medieval Cookbook. (1996, 2012). Maggie Black. British Museum Press.
 Medieval Cookery: Recipes and History''. (2003). Maggie Black. Historic England Publishing.

References 

People from Fulham
1921 births
1999 deaths
University of the Witwatersrand alumni
20th-century English women writers
English food writers
English cookbook writers